The Sydney Business School, University of Wollongong, was established in 1997. It is the graduate school of the Faculty of Business and offers postgraduate business programs at the Sydney CBD Campus located at Circular Quay, and UOW’s Wollongong Campus.

Campuses and Facilities

Sydney CBD Campus  
The Sydney CBD Campus of the Sydney Business School is located at Circular Quay in the Sydney CBD.

Wollongong Campus 
The Wollongong Campus is located at North Wollongong, the University of Wollongong's main campus.

Southern Sydney Campus
The South Western Sydney campus in Liverpool, opened in 2017.

Programmes
The Sydney Business School at the University of Wollongong offers a range of postgraduate business courses delivered from Wollongong and Sydney. Key programs on offer are:

 Graduate Certificate in Applied Finance 
 Graduate Certificate in Business (Online Delivery available) 
 Graduate Certificate in Business Administration 
 Graduate Certificate in Human Resource Management 
 Graduate Certificate in Innovation and Entrepreneurship 
 Graduate Certificate in Marketing 
 Graduate Certificate in Professional Accounting 
 Graduate Diploma in Business Administration 
 Doctor of Business Administration
 Executive Master of Business Administration
 Master of Applied Finance
 Master of Business Administration
 Master of Business
 Master of Science (Project Management/Supply Chain Management)
 Master of Professional Accounting 
 Master of Professional Accounting Advanced

Research Centre
The Australian Health Services Research Institute

Affiliations
The UOW Sydney Business School is affiliated with a range of professional associations representing management education institutions, these include:

 The Association to Advance Collegiate Schools of Business (AACSB)
 The European Foundation for Management Development (EFMD)
 Principles for Responsible Management Education (PRME)
 The Association of Asia-Pacific Business Schools (AAPBS)

Notable alumni

 Brendan Lyon - Chief Executive of Infrastructure Partnerships Australia
 Dr. Stephen Martin - CEO, CEDA
 Russell Packer - National Rugby League

References

External links
 

Faculties of the University of Wollongong
University of Wollongong